Dyakonovskoye is a rural locality (a village) in Nifantovskoye Rural Settlement, Sheksninsky District, Vologda Oblast, Russia. The population was 38 as of 2002. There are 2 streets.

Geography 
Dyakonovskoye is located 11 km northwest of Sheksna (the district's administrative centre) by road. Ivankovo is the nearest rural locality.

References 

Rural localities in Sheksninsky District